Rachel Bess (born c. 1979) is an American artist working out of Phoenix, Arizona.

Background
She got her BFA in painting from the Honors College at Arizona State University in 2001. She taught life drawing and painting at New School for the Arts and Academics in Tempe, Arizona from 2002 to 2007 before leaving academia to paint full-time.

Bess is known for her highly realistic, sometimes surrealistic, baroque-style oil paintings on panel.  Her work has drawn comparisons to that of the Dutch Masters, as well as to certain subgenres of the lowbrow art movement.

In 2014 she was awarded the Arlene and Morton Scult Contemporary Forum Artist Award (the Contemporary Forum is a support organization of the Phoenix Art Museum).

Bess prepared a series of paintings to exhibit at Art Miami 2016. They consisted of paintings of rotting fruit, a subject she'd been working on for several years, which are a comment on the human body, aging, and death. In December 2016 she was awarded a $5000 grant from the Arizona Commission on the Arts, which she intended to use to support four months of research into underpainting.

Currently Bess helps to organize the Phoenix branch of Dr Sketchy's Anti-Art School, and writes/illustrates a comic book titled, "Fighting Death Through Reanimation".

Bess was represented by Perihelion Arts in downtown Phoenix, prior to representation by the Lisa Sette Gallery in Phoenix.

She is also an expert in rearing urban chickens and has published a handbook on the subject, "Fowl Play".

Notable exhibitions
Selected solo shows 

2015. Phoenix Art Museum, Phoenix, Arizona

2014. Lisa Sette Gallery, Scottsdale, Arizona

2012. Lisa Sette Gallery, Scottsdale, Arizona

2011. Perihelion Arts, Phoenix, Arizona

2010
 Copro Gallery, Los Angeles, California
 Perihelion Arts, Phoenix, Arizona
 Rodger LaPelle Gallery, Philadelphia, Pennsylvania
2009.
 Copro Gallery, Los Angeles, California
 Perihelion Arts, Phoenix, Arizona
2008. Cattle Track Arts Compound, Scottsdale, Arizona

2007. Trinity Gallery, Philadelphia, Pennsylvania. May.

2006. Modified Arts, Phoenix, Arizona. November–December.

2005. Casa Grande Museum of Art, Casa Grande, Arizona. January–February.

References

External links
 Official Site
 Fighting Death through Reanimation comic
 Rachel Bess - Surreal Art Collective

American women painters
Living people
Year of birth uncertain
Painters from Phoenix, Arizona
1970s births
21st-century American women artists